The South African Railways Class ES1 of 1924 was an electric locomotive.

In 1924, the South African Railways placed a single Class ES1 battery-powered shunting locomotive in service at the construction site of the Colenso power station. In 1927, the power station and the locomotive were sold to the Electricity Supply Commission and in 1937 the locomotive was purchased back for use at the Daimana (Danskraal) locomotive depot.

Manufacturer
During the electrification of the Glencoe to Pietermaritzburg section of the Natal mainline, a mountainous single-track line which carried heavy mineral traffic towards the port of Durban on an alignment with severe gradients and tight curves, the Colenso power station was built by the South African Railways (SAR) to supply the power for this line.

A single battery-powered electric shunting locomotive, the only battery-powered locomotive to ever see service on the SAR, was purchased from English Electric in 1924 for use at the power station construction site.

Characteristics
The centre-cab locomotive had a Bo wheel arrangement, the two axles being driven by two  traction motors, operating at 235 volts and powered by a 208 cell nickel-iron alkali type battery with a 435 amp-hour capacity.

Service
The locomotive remained in service at the Colenso power station after 1927, when the power station and all its equipment, including the battery locomotive, was sold to the Electricity Supply Commission (ESKOM), the state-owned South African national power corporation.

In 1937, the locomotive was purchased back from ESKOM by the SAR, designated Class ES1 with unit number E123 and stationed at the Daimana (Danskraal) locomotive depot at Ladysmith where it was used as shop shunting engine to move cold steam locomotives and dead electric units. Nicknamed Queen Mary, it was later renumbered to E502. It remained in service at Danskraal until it was withdrawn from service in 1978.

References

2720
2720
English Electric locomotives
Bo locomotives
Cape gauge railway locomotives
Railway locomotives introduced in 1924
1924 in South Africa